is a Japanese footballer who plays as a centre back for EFL Championship club Huddersfield Town and the Japan national team.

Club career

Kashiwa Reysol 
Nakayama was born in Ibaraki, Japan. He made his official debut for Kashiwa Reysol in the J. League Division 1, AFC Champions League on 6 May 2015 against the Vietnam-based club Binh Duong F.C in Go Dau Stadium in Thu Dau Mot, Vietnam. He started and played the full match, receiving a yellow card in the 83rd minute. Nakayama and his club lost the match 1–0.

In 2017, Nakayama was named J.League Rookie of the Year.

PEC Zwolle 
On 15 January 2019, Nakayama joined Eredivisie team PEC Zwolle on a three and half year deal. He made his debut for Zwolle on 31 March 2019, in a 3–0 home victory over FC Emmen. He scored his first goal in the Netherlands, on 17 January 2020, in a 3–3 draw against Utrecht.

Huddersfield Town 
On 15 July 2022, following PEC Zwolle's relegation from the Eredivisie, Nakayama joined EFL Championship club Huddersfield Town on a two year deal. Nakayama scored his first goal in England in his third appearance for Huddersfield, a 3–1 victory over Stoke City on 13 August 2022.

International career
In May 2017, Nakayama was elected Japan U-20 national team for 2017 U-20 World Cup. At this tournament, he played full time in all four matches as center back.

He made his Japan national team debut on 17 June 2019 in the 2019 Copa América game against Chile, as a starter.

Nakayama was selected for the 2022 FIFA World Cup, but he was forced to withdraw from the official squad list, due to an achilles injury.

Career statistics

Club

National team

Honors
Individual
 J.League Rookie of the Year: 2017

References

External links
 
 
 
 Profile at Kashiwa Reysol official website 
 
 

1997 births
Living people
Association football defenders
Association football people from Saitama Prefecture
Japanese footballers
Japan youth international footballers
Japan under-20 international footballers
Japan international footballers
J1 League players
J3 League players
Kashiwa Reysol players
PEC Zwolle players
Huddersfield Town A.F.C. players
Eredivisie players
J.League U-22 Selection players
2019 Copa América players
Japanese expatriate footballers
Expatriate footballers in the Netherlands
Expatriate footballers in England
Japanese expatriate sportspeople in England
Footballers at the 2020 Summer Olympics
Olympic footballers of Japan
English Football League players
Japanese expatriate sportspeople in the Netherlands